Leotina Sivelio Petelo is a Samoan weightlifter who has represented Samoa at the Pacific Games.

Petelo is from Ululoloa, Salailua and Saleaula and was educated at Faleata College.

She contested the 2019 Junior World Weightlifting Championships, coming 5th in the 81 kg category. At the 2019 Pacific Games in Apia she won three gold medals in the 81 kg division. She also won gold in the junior and senior 81 kg categories at the 2019 Oceania Weightlifting Championships and 2019 Commonwealth Weightlifting Championships, which were held concurrently.

References

Living people
People from Gaga'emauga
People from Palauli
Samoan female weightlifters
21st-century Samoan people
Year of birth missing (living people)